Bharat Bhavan is an autonomous multi-arts complex and museum in Bhopal, India, established and funded by the Government of Madhya Pradesh.The architect of the Bharat Bhavan is Charles Correa. Opened in 1982, facing the Upper Lake, Bhopal, it houses multiple art galleries, a graphic printing workshop, a ceramics workshop, an open-air amphitheatre, a studio theatre, an auditorium, a museum of tribal & folk art, and libraries of Indian poetry, classical music & folk music.

History 

The early 1980s saw a burgeoning of the Indian arts scene and a renewed government focus on developing arts across the nation, through regional centers for arts in state capitals. The initiative, in Madhya Pradesh, was furthered to fruition by cultural administrator, Ashok Vajpeyi, an IAS-officer in the state Ministry of Education (1966-1992), who was also behind the setting up of the literary organization, 'Kalidas Academy', in Ujjain in 1983. Though some cultural initiatives lost steam in later years in many parts of India, one project that became a success is the Bharat Bhavan (India House) in Bhopal.

The institution was inaugurated on February 13, 1982 by then Prime Minister, Indira Gandhi. It was established and funded by the Department of Culture, Government of Madhya Pradesh, though it is run by an autonomous 12-member Bharat Bhavan Trust. In the following decade, the institution grew to become an important cultural institution of India as it started attracting artists, scholars, students and other visitors from Indore, Jabalpur, Mumbai, Kolkata and even foreign countries.

During its formative years, theatre personality, B. V. Karanth who headed the 'Rangamandal repertory', incorporated folk forms of the region into his work, staged many productions in Hindi, especially during his stint at the Bharat Bhavan. The "Bharat Bhavan Biennial of Contemporary Indian Art" started in 1986, followed by "Bharat Bhavan International Print Biennial" in 1989. The complex is most known for its art museum, Roopankar, which houses a permanent collection of tribal art, collected by Jagdish Swaminathan in its early years, and represents the best examples of tribal art in India.

The 'Vagarth' centre of Hindi poetry and literature houses a library and archive of Indian poetry, classical music and folk music. It organizes the 'Katha Prasang' festival on Hindi literature.

Overview
The complex includes an art gallery of Indian painting and sculpture, a fine art workshop, an open-air amphitheatre ("Bahirang"), a studio theatre ("Abhirang"), an auditorium ("Antarang"), a museum of tribal & folk art and libraries of Indian poetry, classical music & folk music. Besides this, the Bhavan hosts artists and writers under its artist-in-residence program at the "Ashram". Over the years, it has also become a popular tourist attraction.

Some of the wings include:

 Roopankar - Museum of Fine Art: Gallery of contemporary, folk & tribal art and a modern art gallery, a Graphic Art workshop and a Ceramics Art workshop
 Rangmandal - theatre repertory
 Vagarth - center of Indian poetry, library, archive and translation center
 Anhad - library of classical and folk music, audio and video archives, it organizes dance recitals and classical music series like, Parampara and Saptak
 Chhavi - center of classical cinema
 Nirala Srijanpeeth - the chair for creative writing, founded by the Government of Madhya Pradesh

References

Bibliography

External links

 
 Bharat Bhavan / Charles Correa. Bart Bryant, AD Classics: Bharat Bhavan / Charles Correa, ArchDaily,  1 August 2016

Arts organisations based in India
Museums in Madhya Pradesh
Art museums and galleries in India
Buildings and structures in Bhopal
Tourist attractions in Bhopal
Organisations based in Bhopal
Theatrical organisations in India
Performing arts in India
Theatres in India
Libraries in India
1982 establishments in Madhya Pradesh
Folk art museums and galleries
Arts organizations established in 1982
Art museums established in 1982